"I Have Peace" is a 1997 song by British electronic dance music band Strike, released as the fifth and last single from their only album, I Saw the Future (1997). It is sung by lead vocalist Victoria Newton and the rap is by K. The song is the band's second highest charting hit, peaking at number 17 on the UK Singles Chart and number 11 on the UK Dance Singles Chart. Additionally, it was a top 30 hit in Scotland and a top 40 hit in Switzerland. The original version contains a sample of the 1985 song "Leaving Me Now" by Level 42. A music video was also produced to promote the single.

Critical reception
Pan-European magazine Music & Media wrote that "Strike unveil a new single and new sound this week with I Have Peace, on U.K. label Fresh. This instanty appealing song is a male-voiced rap track, featuring light piano and a female sung chorus. A highly melodic and gospel influenced singalong number." A reviewer from Music Week rated the song four out of five, adding, "Not as instant as their previous released, this represents Strike's most distinctive single yet, moving from a dreamy piano opening into a laidback, rap/gospel-influenced dance groove."

Track listing
 12" single, UK (1997)
"I Have Peace" (Original Mix) 
"I Have Peace" (Uno Clio Vocal Mix)
"I Have Peace" (Forthright Club Mix)
"I Have Peace" (Strike's Late Late Mix)

 CD single, UK (1997)
"I Have Peace" (Original Mix) – 3:55
"I Have Peace" (Forthright 7" Edit) – 3:55
"I Have Peace" (Uno Clio 12" Mix) – 8:26
"I Have Peace" (L.F.A. Mix) – 3:56
"I Have Peace" (K-Gee Mix) – 3:47
"I Have Peace" (Strike's Late Late Mix) – 8:00
"I Have Peace" (Uno Clio Dub) – 7:46

 CD maxi, Netherlands (1997)
"I Have Peace" (Forthright 7" Edit) – 3:50
"I Have Peace" (Original Mix) – 5:52
"I Have Peace" (Uno Clio 12" Mix) – 8:25
"I Have Peace" (L.F.A. Mix) – 3:54
"I Have Peace" (K-Gee Mix) – 3:44
"I Have Peace" (Strike's Late Late Mix) – 8:02

Charts

References

 

1997 singles
1997 songs
Strike (band) songs
Electro songs